Loyola School, Bhubaneswar, is a private Catholic primary and secondary school located in Bhubaneswar, in the state of Odisha, India. The co-educational, English-medium school was founded by the Jesuits in 2001.

The current principal of the school is Fr.Victor Misquith, Sr.

Academics
The curriculum includes English literature, English language, Hindi, Odia, history, geography, civics, mathematics, physics, chemistry, biology, commerce and accountancy, economics, computer science, socially useful productive work (such as class cleaning), environmental studies, value education, community building, moral sciences, and for Christians religious instruction.

Houses 
There are four houses: Ruby (red), Sapphire (blue), Emerald (green), and Topaz (yellow). Every Thursday the school conducts house assemblies separately at four places on the campus: at a small red stage, staff room, junior assembly ground, and the badminton court. The place allotted to a house is for two months, after which they rotate. Each week the students of a particular house look after the campus, to maintain discipline.

The students of the minding house are known as mentors. The houses have moderators, a captain, and a vice-captain from senior and junior year. In alternate years a sports day and a Parents' Night are organized.

Activities 
Intramural, club activities take place on Tuesdays for juniors and No activities for seniors. These include yoga, karate, art & painting, clay modeling (only juniors), keyboard, chess, aerobics, modern dance, cricket, football, table tennis, lawn tennis, badminton, basketball (only seniors), French language (only seniors), singing (only seniors), traditional dance, English communications (only STD 4 & 5), and guitar (only juniors).

See also

 Catholic Church in India
 List of Jesuit schools
 List of schools in Odisha

References  

Jesuit secondary schools in India
Jesuit primary schools in India
 High schools and secondary schools in Odisha
 Christian schools in Odisha
 Schools in Bhubaneswar
 Educational institutions established in 2001
2001 establishments in Orissa